Darth Vader building most often refers to the Fourth and Blanchard Building in Seattle, Washington.

Darth Vader building may also refer to:

 Dakin Building, in Brisbane, California
 Lamar Building, in Augusta, Georgia

See also
 Darth Vader grotesque, on the Washington National Cathedral, Washington, D.C